Georgia's 11th congressional district is a congressional district in the U.S. state of Georgia. The district is currently represented by Republican Barry Loudermilk. The district's boundaries have been redrawn following the 2010 census, which granted an additional congressional seat to Georgia.  The first election using the new district boundaries (listed below) were the 2012 congressional elections.

Located in the northwestern portion of the Atlanta metropolitan area, the district covers the entirety of Bartow and Cherokee counties, as well as northwestern and central Cobb County and the northern "neck" of Fulton County. It includes Cartersville, Kennesaw, Marietta, Woodstock, and portions of the city of Atlanta.

Counties
 Bartow
 Cherokee
 Pickens
 Cobb (Partial, see also , and )

Recent results in presidential elections

List of members representing the district

Election results

2016

2018

2020

2022

References

Further reading

External links
 PDF map of Georgia's 11th district at nationalatlas.gov
 Georgia's 11th district at GovTrack.us
 Congressional Biographical Directory of the United States 1774–present

11
Bartow County, Georgia
Carroll County, Georgia
Chattooga County, Georgia
Cobb County, Georgia
Floyd County, Georgia
Gordon County, Georgia
Haralson County, Georgia
Paulding County, Georgia
Polk County, Georgia